Suranganie Dharmawardhane Flanagan is a Sri Lankan molecular biologist and biochemist. She is a professor of biochemistry at the University of Puerto Rico School of Medicine.

Education 
In 1980, Dharmawardhane completed a B.S. at University of Colombo. She earned a M.S. at Northeastern University in 1984. She completed a Ph.D. at University of Massachusetts Amherst in 1987. Her dissertation was titled Light-stimulated transplasmalemma electron transport in oat mesophyll cells. She conducted postdoctoral training at Albert Einstein College of Medicine under .

Career 
She was an assistant professor of molecular, cell, and developmental biology at the University of Texas at Austin (UT Austin) from 1998 to 2005. At UT Austin, Dharmawardhane collaborated with biomedical engineers to develop and design both whole body and microscopic fluorescence image analysis of breast cancer cells in mice. She was an associate professor first in the department of anatomy and cell biology (2005 to 2009) and later in the department of biochemistry (2009 to 2015) at University of Puerto Rico, Medical Sciences Campus (UPR-RCM). In 2015, Dharmawardhane became a tenured full professor and the graduate student coordinator in the department of biochemistry at UPR-RCM. She was an adjunct associate professor in the department of anatomy and cell biology at Universidad Central del Caribe.

Dharmawardhane transferred much of her research program in fluorescence imaging and breast cancer metastasis from UT Austin to University of Puerto Rico. Her laboratory researches breast cancer metastasis and the related molecular mechanisms of signal transaction. She also characterizes pharmacological and natural inhibitors of cancer metastasis. Dharmawardhane has experience with biochemical and molecular analysis of breast cancer cell therapeutics. She conducts much of her research with mouse models.

Dharmawardhane mentors researchers from the undergraduate level to assistant professors. She aims to help mentor women and minorities in biomedical research and academia.

References

External links 

 

Year of birth missing (living people)
Living people
Place of birth missing (living people)
Alumni of the University of Colombo
Northeastern University alumni
University of Massachusetts Amherst alumni
Scripps Research faculty
University of Texas at Austin faculty
University of Puerto Rico faculty
Sri Lankan emigrants to the United States
Sri Lankan expatriate academics
Expatriate academics in the United States
Sri Lankan women scientists
Sri Lankan biochemists
Women molecular biologists
20th-century women scientists
20th-century biologists
20th-century chemists
21st-century women scientists
21st-century biologists
21st-century chemists
Women biochemists